Riders of Vengeance is a 1919 American Western film directed by John Ford and featuring Harry Carey. The film is considered to be lost.

Plot
Harry's bride is murdered at their wedding along with Harry's mother and father, and the good-hearted outlaw turns grimly malevolent. He leaves town, only to return one year later. One by one he stalks his wife's killers, dispatching them all until he finally sets his sights, mistakenly, on Sheriff Gale Thurman. The lawman bests Harry and keeps him hiding outside town in the wilderness. Straying into the same wilderness, the Sheriff's girlfriend is first overtaken by highwaymen, then rescued by Harry, only to be taken captive by Harry when he realizes who she is. At first threatening to harm the girl, Harry slowly falls in love with her, all while hostile Apaches attempt to kill them both. By the time the Sheriff tracks them down, a full-scale assault is under way, and the two men join forces. Harry realizes the Sheriff's innocence, but it is too late: the lawman is dead from his battle wounds, but he has saved his girlfriend - and Harry.

Cast
 Harry Carey as Cheyenne Harry
 Seena Owen as The Girl
 Joe Harris as Gale Thurman (as Joseph Harris)
 J. Farrell MacDonald as Buell
 Alfred Allen as Harry's Father
 Jennie Lee as Harry's Mother
 Clita Gale as Virginia
 Vester Pegg
 Betty Schade
 Millard K. Wilson as (as M.K. Wilson)

Production
Riders of Vengeance was released as a Universal Special feature in June 1919, a 60-minute silent film on six reels. It was part of the long-running "Cheyenne Harry" series of film featurettes. The story was an uncommon collaboration between the star Harry Carey and the director John Ford (with help from scenarist Eugene Lewis). Though it has an unusually high level of violence ("lots of killings", as Moving Picture World noted), critical reviews of the time lavishly praised both the story and film.

See also
 John Ford filmography
 Harry Carey filmography
 List of lost films

References

External links
 
 Riders of Vengeance at SilentEra

1919 films
1919 lost films
1919 Western (genre) films
American black-and-white films
Films directed by John Ford
Lost Western (genre) films
Lost American films
Silent American Western (genre) films
Universal Pictures films
1910s American films